The 1982 Croydon Borough Council election took place on 6 May 1982 to elect members of Croydon London Borough Council in London, England. The whole council was up for election and the Conservative Party stayed in overall control of the council.

Background

Election result

Ward results

Addiscombe

Ashburton

Bensham Manor

Beulah

Broad Green

Coulsdon East

Croham

Fairfield

Fieldway

Heathfield

Kenley

Monks Orchard

New Addington

Norbury

Purley

Rylands

Liberal Party withdrew their support during the campaign.

Sanderstead

Selsdon

South Norwood

Spring Park

Thornton Heath

Upper Norwood

Waddon

West Thornton

Whitehorse Manor

Woodcote & Coulsdon West

Woodside

References

1982
1982 London Borough council elections
May 1982 events in the United Kingdom